Kalagaity  is a village located in Mal (community development block) in the Jalpaiguri district in the state of West Bengal, India.

References 

Villages in Jalpaiguri district